Rogue Legacy 2 is a platform video game developed and published by Cellar Door Games. It is the sequel to 2013's Rogue Legacy, and the game was released for Windows via early access in August 2020. The full version was released in April 2022, for Microsoft Windows, Xbox One and Xbox Series X/S, followed by a Nintendo Switch port in November.

Gameplay 
Rogue Legacy 2 is a platform game with roguelike and Metroidvania elements. In the game, the player assumes control of a knight, who must explore procedurally generated dungeons to collect its treasures and defeat enemies. While the knight is equipped with swords and shields and mages can cast magic, the game introduces several additional gameplay classes. These new classes include the Ranger who can summon platforms and use a bow and arrow, and the Barbarian who uses an axe. As a roguelike, players will have to start from the beginning when their player avatar is killed in the game. However, the gold they have collected in each run can be spent on permanent upgrades such as new weapons, gear and runes. When the player starts a run again, they will have to pick a random character with different genetic traits, which may either enhance or hinder the player's combat efficiency. While exploring a dungeon, they will also collect Heirlooms, which are permanent ability upgrades that are hidden in special rooms.

Development 
Cellar Door Games announced Rogue Legacy 2 on April 3, 2020. While the studio planned to release the game via early access in July 2020, it was later shifted to August 18, 2020. The initial early access release contained one and a half dungeons, four gameplay classes, and one enemy boss. The studio planned to release large updates every two months, and expected the game to stay in early access for around a year. The game's development lasted for about four years. The game left early access and fully released on April 28, 2022, for Microsoft Windows, Xbox One and Xbox Series X/S.

Reception 

Rogue Legacy 2 received "universal acclaim" for Xbox Series X/S according to review aggregator Metacritic; the Windows version received "generally favorable" reviews.

Michtell Satlzman of IGN awarded the game a 9 out of 10, stating that the game is "a transformative sequel that essentially rebuilds the extraordinarily influential 2013 original into a modern roguelite that stands nearly shoulder to shoulder with the best of the genre."

References

External links 
 

2022 video games
Indie video games
Metroidvania games
Nintendo Switch games
Platform games
Roguelike video games
Video games developed in Canada
Video games featuring protagonists of selectable gender
Video games using procedural generation
Windows games
Early access video games
Video game sequels
Xbox One games
Xbox Series X and Series S games
Video games scored by Grant Henry